Karina Duprez (born Karina Julia Descalzó Guzmán on December 23, 1946, in Mexico City, Mexico) is a Mexican director and former actress.

Early life
Duprez was born on December 23, 1946, in Mexico City, Mexico. She is a daughter of actress Magda Guzmán and Julián Duprez. She has two siblings, Gerardo and Mirtha Duprez, and one half-brother, Carlos Falcón, from her mother's second marriage.

She is the mother of actress Magda Karina. In 1979, she married actor Carlos Ancira. Their marriage lasted until his death in 1987.

At the age of 5, she participated in the theatrical production of Juegos prohibidos. He later studied acting at the Andres Soller Academy, then at the National Institute of Fine Arts and the Faculty of Philosophy and Literature at the National Autonomous University of Mexico. She then went to London to study theater directing. She made his television and film debut in the mid-1960s.

Filmography

Awards & nominations

References

External links 
 

1946 births
Living people
20th-century Mexican actresses
Actresses from Mexico City
Mexican telenovela actresses
Mexican television actresses
Mexican television directors
People from Mexico City
Women television directors